Phaea eyai is a species of beetle in the family Cerambycidae. It was described by Chemsak in 1999. It is known from Mexico.

References

eyai
Beetles described in 1999